The March of Ancona ( or Anconetana) was a frontier march centred on the city of Ancona and later Fermo then Macerata in the Middle Ages.  Its name is preserved as an Italian region today, the Marche, and it corresponds to almost the entire modern region and not just the Province of Ancona.

History 
Originally part of Imperial Italy, the march was constituted around 1100 from the March of Fermo and a southern portion of the Byzantine Pentapolis. Initially the new march took the name of its first ruler: marca Guarnerii or march of Werner. There were disputes between the Empire and the Church over rights and jurisdiction in the March. In 1173, an imperial army under Christian of Mainz invaded the March against pro-papal resistance led by Countess Boltruda Frangipani. In 1177, Pope Alexander III referred to it as "partly belonging to the empire but largely to the church".

The march was definitely acquired by the Papal States during the pontificate of Innocent III in the year 1198. It was initially governed by a papal nominee called a rector. The rector of Ancona, like the rectors of other papal provinces, was under the authority of a general rector reporting directly to the pope. Under the papacy, the March had three towns of over 10,000 people: Ancona, Ascoli Piceno and Fermo.

The province was reorganized by the Constitutiones Sanctæ Matris Ecclesiæ in 1357. The march followed the Adriatic as far north as Urbino and contained the cities of Loreto, Camerino, Fermo, Macerata, Osimo, San Severino, and Tolentino

According to Paul Sabatier's biography of St. Francis of Assisi, "The Road to Assisi", the March of Ancona became the home of the spiritual Franciscans after Francis' death.

Rulers
Werner (1093–1109)
Conrad of Lützelhard (1177– )
Markward von Annweiler (1184–1202)

Marquess

House of Este
The line of "Marquesses of Este"("Marchesi d'Este") rises in 1039 with Albert Azzo II, Margrave of Milan. The name "Este" is related to the city where the family came from, Este. 
The family was founded by Adalbert the Margrave. who might have been the true first Margrave of Milan of this family. In 1209 Azzo VI is named the first "Marquess of Ferrara", and the title passed to his descendants, and Este Marquisate's was delegated to a cadet branch of the family. Later, were also created the Marquisates of Modena and Reggio.

House of Sforza

Francesco I Sforza (1434–1443).

References

Bibliography

History of the papacy
History of Catholicism in Italy
Geography of the Marche
History of le Marche
Ancona